Merrill Maurice Forte (March 1, 1947 – February 26, 2021) was an American football player and coach. He served as the head coach at North Carolina Agricultural and Technical State University from 1982 to 1987, Norfolk State University from 1999 to 2002 and the University of Arkansas at Pine Bluff from 2004 to 2007. Forte compiled a career college football record of 57–90–1.

Forte died on February 26, 2021, in Pine Bluff, Arkansas.

Head coaching record

Football

Notes

References

1947 births
2021 deaths
American football running backs
Arizona State Sun Devils football coaches
Arkansas–Pine Bluff Golden Lions football coaches
Denver Broncos coaches
Detroit Lions coaches
Duke Blue Devils football coaches
Michigan State Spartans football coaches
Minnesota Golden Gophers football coaches
Minnesota Golden Gophers football players
North Carolina A&T Aggies football coaches
Norfolk State Spartans football coaches
African-American coaches of American football
African-American players of American football
People from Hannibal, Missouri
20th-century African-American sportspeople
21st-century African-American sportspeople